The NBA on NBC is the branding used for presentations of National Basketball Association (NBA) games produced by the NBC television network in the United States. NBC held broadcast rights from 1955 to 1962 and again from 1990 (when it obtained the rights from CBS) to 2002. During NBC's partnership with the NBA in the 1990s, the league rose to unprecedented popularity, with ratings surpassing the days of Magic Johnson and Larry Bird in the mid-1980s. Although the main NBC network no longer airs NBA broadcasts, NBA games currently air on the NBC Sports Regional Networks in the form of game telecasts that air on a regional basis, featuring local NBA teams that each of the regional networks have respective broadcast rights to air in their designated market.

Overview

1954–62 incarnation
NBC's first tenure with the National Basketball Association began on October 30, 1954, and lasted until April 7, 1962. NBC's very first NBA telecast was a game between the Boston Celtics and Rochester Royals in Rochester.

For the 1954–55 season, Marty Glickman and Lindsey Nelson called all games except on April 9 (Fort Wayne @ Syracuse during the playoffs), when Glickman worked with Jim Gordon. Nelson would later write in his autobiography, Hello Everybody, I'm Lindsey Nelson that NBA commissioner Maurice Podoloff would travel to the televised games and, when NBC needed to get in a commercial, he would go up to one of the coaches and say, "Call a timeout," and they had to, since the commissioner ordered it. On March 19, 1955, during the playoffs, NBC gave the national spotlight to the New York Knicks and rising Boston Celtics at New York's Madison Square Garden.

For the first year of NBC's tenure, the first five weeks of coverage followed a Canadian Football League game. That contract decreed that the network show 13 games (along with presumably the Grey Cup) on Saturday afternoons beginning in late August, and was signed one week after NBC had lost the rights to NCAA football to ABC.

The following year, Lindsey Nelson was paired with Curt Gowdy on commentary for all games except on February 25 (St. Louis @ New York), March 3 (Minneapolis @ Rochester with Nelson working with Joe Lapchick), and March 24 (Fort Wayne @ St. Louis with Nelson working alone). On March 31, 1956, NBC broadcast the first nationally televised NBA Finals game, which was Game 1 of the Philadelphia-Fort Wayne series.

Gowdy and Nelson were retained as the primary broadcast team for NBC in 1956–57 except on March 23 and March 30 (St. Louis @ Boston), when Nelson worked by himself. While the team of Gowdy and Nelson again did most games in 1957–58, Nelson worked the December 14 telecast (Syracuse @ Detroit) with Chick Hearn, who in return, worked the January 11 telecast (Syracuse @ Cincinnati) with Gowdy. For the January 18 telecast (Detroit @ St. Louis), Nelson worked alone while on February 1 (Syracuse @ Minneapolis), Nelson was paired with Bill O'Donnell. Meanwhile, Gowdy worked alone on March 1 (Cincinnati @ Philadelphia).

NBC also during the 1957–58 season, broadcast a game in Detroit between Cincinnati and the Pistons on March 15. It was after this game, on the flight home to Cincinnati, that Maurice Stokes became ill and later suffered a seizure, fell into a coma and was left permanently paralyzed. This was the delayed reaction from having hit his head in a game three days earlier. Stokes died in April 1970.

In the 1958-59 season, Curt Gowdy worked alone on all games except on March 15 (New York @ Syracuse, when Gowdy worked with Bud Palmer), April 5 (Minneapolis @ Boston with Lindsey Nelson). The 1959 NBA All-Star Game marked the first time that the All-Star Game was nationally televised. However, NBC only broadcast the second half at 10 p.m. Eastern Time, in lieu of its Friday Night Fights telecast. The fact that the All-Star Game prior to this, was almost always played on a Tuesday night meant that NBC would have had to sacrifice most, if not all, of their evening programming. In the first few years, that would have meant taking off Milton Berle's program, which was starting to slide, but still would have made more money for the network than a pro basketball game. Plus, NBA owners weren't terribly savvy when it came to working with TV in this era, so they probably refused network requests to put it in a weekend afternoon slot.

During the 1959–60 season, Curt Gowdy worked alone most on Saturday games while Lindsey Nelson worked alone on most Sunday games. Nelson also worked on Saturday April 2 (St. Louis @ Boston) during the playoffs. Marty Glickman meanwhile, worked alone on December 6 (St. Louis @ Cincinnati), January 2–3 (New York Knicks @ Cincinnati and Boston @ Syracuse), February 28 (Philadelphia @ Detroit), March 13 (Philadelphia @ Syracuse), 20 (Boston @ Philadelphia), and 27 (St. Louis @ Boston), and April 3 (Boston @ St. Louis). Finally, Bill O'Donnell worked alone on March 12 (Minneapolis @ Detroit), 19 (St. Louis @ Minneapolis), and 26 (Minneapolis @ St. Louis).
 
In the 1960-61 season, Lindsey Nelson was alone on all games except when he worked with Bud Palmer on October 22 (New York @ Cincinnati) and 29 (New York @ Detroit), November 26 (Syracuse @ Boston), December 3 (New York @ Syracuse), 10 (Syracuse @ Detroit), and 24 (Detroit @ Boston). Jerry Doggett helped call games on November 5 (Syracuse @ Los Angeles) and 19 (Detroit @ Los Angeles). Marty Glickman contributed to commentary on January 8 (Boston @ St. Louis), 15 (Philadelphia @ Syracuse), 22 (St. Louis @ Cincinnati), and 29 (Philadelphia @ Boston), February 19 (Boston @ Syracuse) and 26 (Boston @ Detroit), March 12 (Boston @ Syracuse), 19 (Syracuse @ Boston), and 26 (Syracuse @ Boston), and April 2 (St. Louis @ Boston).

For NBC's final season of their first stint with the NBA, Bud Palmer worked alone on commentary on all games except for on February 3 (Cincinnati @ New York) and April 7 (Los Angeles @ Boston), when he was paired with Bob Wolff.

NBC's ratings during this time period were lukewarm at best. By 1962, NBA ratings for NBC's Saturday afternoon games dipped to 4.8 (9 million viewers) as compared to Sunday afternoon NFL ratings of 10.4 (15 million viewers). As a matter of fact, CBS was at one point, getting better ratings for their National Hockey League telecasts than NBC was getting with the NBA. One possible factor for the dipping ratings the fact that NBC's 1960–61 schedule placed the three weakest teams--Cincinnati, Syracuse, and Detroit on television a total of 14 times. In comparison, three of the NBA's best teams--Boston, St. Louis, and Philadelphia—appeared on NBC a total of only seven times.

1990–02 iteration

Background
On November 9, 1989, the NBA reached an agreement with the network worth US$600 million contract to broadcast the league's games for four years, beginning with the 1990–91 season. On April 28, 1993, NBC extended its exclusive broadcast rights to the NBA with a four-year, $750 million contract.

Coverage
NBC's coverage of the NBA began on Christmas Day each season, with the exception of the inaugural season in 1990 (which featured a game on November 3, 1990 between the Los Angeles Lakers and the San Antonio Spurs), the 1997–98 season (which included a preseason tournament featuring the Chicago Bulls), the 1998–99 season (as no Christmas games were played due to the 1998–99 NBA lockout), and the final season of the network's contract in 2001–02 (which included two early season games featuring the return of Michael Jordan with the Washington Wizards). NBC aired the NBA All-Star Game every year (with the exception of 1999, when the game was canceled due to the lockout), usually at 6:00 p.m., Eastern Time. In 2002, NBC aired the game an hour earlier (at 5:00 p.m., Eastern) due to the Winter Olympics later that evening. Starting in 2000, during the NBA Playoffs, NBC would air tripleheaders on Saturdays and Sundays during the first two weeks of the playoffs. Prior to 2000, NBC would air a doubleheader on Saturday, followed by a tripleheader on Sunday.

On December 30, 2000, NBC aired a rare second December game. The Saturday match was the only time that NBC aired a game between Christmas Day and the start of the regular run of games in February. In 2001, NBC was scheduled to air an October preseason game involving an NBA team playing an international team; that game was canceled due to the September 11 attacks. During the 2001–02 NBA season, NBC added a significant number of Washington Wizards games to its schedule (due to the aforementioned return of Michael Jordan). When Jordan became injured during the middle of the season, the network replaced the added Wizards games with the games that had been originally on the schedule (for example, a March 2002 game between the Wizards and Orlando Magic was replaced at the last minute with an Indiana Pacers–Sacramento Kings game).

Music

The theme music for the NBA on NBC broadcasts, "Roundball Rock", was composed by new-age artist John Tesh. The instrumental piece, which NBC used for every telecast during the network's twelve-year tenure. Although Tesh offered the theme to ABC when it took over the rights to the league, the network declined.

In 1991, "The Dream is Still Alive" by Wilson Phillips was played during the end of the season montage. Afterwards, until 1996, NBC would play the rock song "Winning It All" by The Outfield during its end-of-season montage. From 1997 to 2001, several contemporary music pieces were used for the montage (including, in 1997, R. Kelly's song "I Believe I Can Fly", which coincidentally came from a basketball film – Space Jam, which starred Michael Jordan, in 1998, John Williams's song Exsultate Justi, and Pat Benatar's song "All Fired Up" from 1999 to 2001). After the 1999 Finals, NBC used "Fly Away" by Lenny Kravitz for their montage.

In 2002, after NBC's final broadcast, the network aired a montage of memorable moments from every year of coverage, using music from "Titans Spirit" (from the film Remember the Titans) to "Winning It All" and most notably, "To The Flemish Cap" from the 2000 film The Perfect Storm. The song composed by James Horner is played at the beginning of the montage as well as the end featuring footage from the Los Angeles Lakers dynasty era. This theme song has made a brief comeback as part of NBC's Olympic basketball coverage in 2008, and again in 2016. In December 2018, Fox Sports acquired the rights to "Roundball Rock" for use during college basketball games. All Elite Wrestling then secured the rights to the song in December 2022 for use during promotion of Winter Is Coming, with AEW president Tony Khan being said to a major fan of the theme.

Segments
The pre-game show for NBC's NBA telecasts was NBA Showtime, a title that was used from 1990 until 2000, with the pre-game being unbranded afterward. Showtime was originally hosted by Bob Costas from the inaugural season of the 1990 contract to the 1995–96 season; Hannah Storm took over as host beginning with the 1996–97 season, who in turn was replaced by Ahmad Rashad in 2001 when Storm went on maternity leave. The video game NBA Showtime: NBA on NBC, by Midway Games, was named after the pregame show.

During the NBA Finals, additional coverage would be immediately available on CNBC, in which the panelists provided an additional half-hour of in-depth game discussions, after the NBC broadcast network's coverage concluded.

The halftime show was sponsored by Prudential Financial (Prudential Halftime Report), and later NetZero (NetZero at the Half) and Verizon Wireless (Verizon Wireless at the Half). The broadcasts also featured a segment during the live games called Miller Genuine Moments, which provided a brief retrospective on a particular historically significant and/or dramatic moment in NBA history; this segment was discontinued towards the end of NBC's coverage. The song used as the soundtrack for the Miller Genuine Moments segment was "Black Hole" by John Tesh. For a brief period in 2001–02, NBC aired a studio segment called 24, in which each analyst (at that time, Pat Croce, Jayson Williams or Mike Fratello) would have 24 seconds to talk about issues concerning the NBA. NBC (in conjunction with completely revamping the pregame show) discontinued the segment in February 2002, after Williams was arrested on murder charges.

Ratings

During its twelve-year run, the NBA on NBC experienced ratings highs and lows for the NBA. In the 1990s, the NBA Finals ratings were stellar, with the exception of 1999 Finals. In 1998, the NBA set a Finals ratings record, with an 18.7 household rating for the second Chicago Bulls–Utah Jazz series, the last championship run by the Michael Jordan-led Bulls. The very next year (after a lockout which erased part of the season), the ratings for the 1999 Finals plummeted, marking the beginning of an ongoing period of lower viewership for the league's game telecasts. In 2002, NBC set a record for the highest-rated Western Conference Final, including a 14.2 rating for Game 7 of the series between the Los Angeles Lakers and Sacramento Kings.

NBC's highest-rated regular season game was Michael Jordan's first game back from playing minor league baseball; the March 1995 game between the Chicago Bulls and Indiana Pacers scored a 10.9 rating (higher than all but three NBA telecasts on ABC). As a comparison, the first game in Jordan's second comeback (a game against the New York Knicks that aired on TBS opposite the 2001 World Series) scored a rating between a 3.0 and 4.0. NBC's first game of Jordan's second comeback scored ratings similar to that number.

Criticisms

Several NBA observers accused NBC and the NBA of being biased with only certain teams and individual players. NBC benefited from having all of the Finals it televised involve the large-market Chicago Bulls, Los Angeles Lakers, New York Knicks, New Jersey Nets, Philadelphia 76ers or Houston Rockets; however, smaller-market teams such as those in San Antonio, Sacramento, Phoenix, Seattle, Portland, Utah, Indiana, Orlando and Miami all made regular appearances on NBC games during its run.

The end of The NBA on NBC
Upon the expiration of NBC Sports' contract with the NBA in 2002, the league signed a broadcast television rights agreement with ABC, which began airing games in the 2002–03 season. NBC had made a four-year, US$1.3 billion bid in the spring of 2002 to renew its NBA rights, but the league instead made six-year deals worth $4 billion with ESPN, ABC, and TNT.

Simply put, NBC could not compete with the combined broadcast and cable deal that Disney had with ESPN and ABC. To put things into proper perspective, when NBC's relationship with the NBA ended in 2002, their only cable properties then were CNBC and MSNBC. The major leagues receive more money from cable than broadcast, due to the dual revenue stream of subscriptions and ad revenue. Additionally, NBC lost $35 million because of the failure of the XFL the previous year. As Charles Barkley summed it up during halftime of Game 1 of the 2002 NBA Finals "If y'all hadn't wasted all that money on the XFL, y'all would still have basketball."

Whereas NBC normally televised 33 regular season games per year, ABC would generally air fewer than 20 regular season games annually. According to NBA Commissioner David Stern, the reduced number of network telecasts was at the league's own request since the NBA believed that they would get a higher audience for a single game (in contrast to NBC's tripleheaders). From 2002 to 2006, the NBA's ratings on broadcast television (ABC) dropped almost a full ratings point (from nearly a 3.0 average rating to just above a 2.0 rating). NBC averaged a 5.5 average rating during the 2002 NBA Playoffs. ABC averaged a 3.3 average rating for the 2005 NBA Playoffs.

In response to the impending loss of NBA coverage, NBC Entertainment president Jeff Zucker said:

Within two years of the network losing the NBA rights, NBC dropped to fourth place in the prime time television rankings for the first time in its history, which was also partly the result of a weaker prime time schedule, and would more or less remain there for almost nine years.

NBC Sports chairman Dick Ebersol said:

Ebersol added:

In a down economy, after losing $100 million on the NBA in 2000-2001, NBC was projecting a $200-million loss in 2001–2002. The NBA also saw its NBC ratings for the regular season fall from 4.3 in 1999 to 3.0 in 2000. Meanwhile, the playoff ratings dipped from 6.5 to 4.9.

NBC network president Randy Falco said:

NBC's last NBA telecast to date was Game 4 of the 2002 NBA Finals, which closed with highlights from the network's 12-year run with the league, through the Chicago Bulls' dynasty led by Michael Jordan and Scottie Pippen, the retirement of Larry Bird and Magic Johnson and the Los Angeles Lakers' new Shaq/Kobe reign. The final image of the end montage was set in an empty gym, showing a basketball bouncing into the background and ending with the message, "Thanks for The Memories." Prior to the sequence, match commentators Marv Albert, Steve Jones and Bill Walton evaluated the end of their NBA contract and of the series. After that, Bob Costas closed the network's last NBA broadcast with the following:

TNT airs many of the NBA's marquee games (the NBA All-Star Game, a full Conference Final (alternating between the Western Conference in even-numbered years and the Eastern conference in odd-numbered years), Opening Night games, and the vast majority of playoff games). In recent years, fans have reckoned it as what NBC was during that network's coverage of the league. TNT would seem to be the NBA's preferred carrier as well; from 2003 to 2005, TNT aired the Conference Final with the most interest from the national media (Spurs-Mavericks in 2003, Lakers-Wolves in 2004 and Pistons-Heat in 2005). TNT also airs most of the big games during the regular season (TNT aired a Lakers-Heat game for the third straight year in 2007), and TNT studio content is streamed to NBA.com via the TNT Overtime section.

Many NBA games currently air with NBC Sports branding as part of the various NBC Sports Regional Networks' (formerly known as Comcast SportsNet) broadcast rights with individual NBA teams.

On February 13, 2023, CNBC reported that NBC has been in preparations to bid for the NBA media rights shortly before the current broadcasting agreement is due to expire in 2025.

Statistics

Announcers

1954–1962
As previously mentioned, NBC Sports first broadcast the NBA from the 1954–55 through 1961–62 seasons. The announcers during this period included:
 Jerry Doggett (1960–1961)
 Marty Glickman (1954–1961)
 Jim Gordon (1954–55)
 Curt Gowdy (1955–1960)
 Chick Hearn (1957–1958)
 Joe Lapchick (1955–56)
 Lindsey Nelson (1954–1961)
 Bill O'Donnell (1957–1960)
 Bud Palmer (1958–1962)
 Bob Wolff (1961–1962)

1990–1997
NBC's first broadcast team of the 1990s–2000s era was made up of Marv Albert and Mike Fratello, with Ahmad Rashad serving as sideline reporter. Other broadcasters at the time included Dick Enberg and Steve "Snapper" Jones. Aside from Rashad, Jim Gray and Hannah Storm also handled sideline reporting duties; before becoming the television voice of the Spurs, Lakers and Pelicans, Joel Meyers also started as a sideline reporter for NBC. Bob Costas presided as host of the network's pre-game show, NBA Showtime, while also providing play-by-play as a fill-in when necessary. During the Playoffs, Don Criqui and Joel Meyers were also used, with Criqui for play-by-play and Meyers mainly as a sideline analyst.

In 1992, shortly after announcing his retirement, basketball legend Earvin "Magic" Johnson became a top game analyst (alongside the likes of Enberg, Albert and Fratello); however, his performance was heavily criticized. Among the complaints were his apparently poor diction skills, his tendency for "stating the obvious", his habitual references to his playing days, and an overall lackluster chemistry with his broadcasting partners. Johnson would ultimately be slowly phased out of the NBA on NBC after helping commentate the 1993 NBA Finals.

In 1994, Mike Fratello left the booth (in order to become the head coach of the Cleveland Cavaliers) and was replaced with Matt Guokas. Albert and Guokas broadcast the 1994 NBA Finals and were joined for the 1995 NBA Finals by Bill Walton. Albert, Guokas and Walton, while not working regular season games together (Walton usually worked games with Steve Jones and play-by-play announcers Dick Enberg, Tom Hammond or Greg Gumbel), broadcast the next two Finals (1996 and 1997) together in a three-man booth.

1998–2000
1997 was the last time Marv Albert would call the NBA Finals for NBC during the decade, as an embarrassing sex scandal forced NBC to fire Albert before the start of the 1997–1998 season. To replace Albert, NBC tapped studio host Bob Costas for play-by-play. Matt Guokas did not return to his post as main color commentator, and was replaced by NBA legend Isiah Thomas; Costas was replaced on the pre-game show by Hannah Storm, whom she replaced in the 1997 NBA Finals. Midway through the season, Costas and Thomas were joined by recently fired Detroit Pistons coach Doug Collins. Collins served to take some weight off Thomas, who was considered by some to be uncomfortable in the role of lead analyst. Thomas, in particular, was singled out for his soft voice and often stammered analysis.

The team of Costas, Thomas and Collins worked the major games that season including the 1998 NBA Finals (which set an all-time ratings record for the NBA). Mike Breen, who was backup announcer to Albert on MSG Network's New York Knicks broadcasts, was hired to do select playoff games that year and was later promoted to backup announcer status for the rest of the NBA's run on NBC. For the 1998–99 season, Thomas was moved to the studio, while Costas and Collins made up the lead team. The 1998–1999 season, which was marred by a lengthy lockout (which resulted in the regular season being shortened to 50 games) included the low-rated 1999 NBA Finals between the San Antonio Spurs and the New York Knicks. Albert was brought back for the 1999–2000 season, making a return which included calling that year's lead Christmas Day game between the San Antonio Spurs and the Los Angeles Lakers from Staples Center.

2000–2001
The 2000–2001 season brought to an end to Bob Costas' direct role with the NBA on NBC (although Costas would work playoff games for the next two seasons and would return to host NBC's coverage for the 2002 NBA Finals). Costas deferred to Marv Albert, allowing Albert to again be the lead broadcaster for the NBA, and stayed on only to deliver interviews and special features. On the studio front, Hannah Storm left her position as studio host to go on maternity leave, with Ahmad Rashad taking over for Storm; Isiah Thomas left NBC to become coach of the Indiana Pacers. Joining Rashad were former Phoenix Suns player Kevin Johnson and former NBA coach P. J. Carlesimo, with Carlesimo also filling in as backup analyst during select playoff games until 2002. Marv Albert joined Doug Collins as the lead broadcast team, and the two broadcast the 2001 NBA Finals, which had the highest ratings for a Finals match since 1998. After the season, Collins was hired away from NBC by the Washington Wizards, which forced the network to move the longtime secondary color duo of Steve Jones and Bill Walton to the lead broadcast team with Albert.

During the 2001 NBA Finals between the Los Angeles Lakers and the Philadelphia 76ers, NBC decided to cross-promote its NBA coverage with its then-popular quiz show The Weakest Link. Two 10-minute editions of The Weakest Link aired during halftime of Games 2 and 3, featuring Bob Costas, Bill Walton and Steve Jones as contestants, along with Charlotte Hornets guard Baron Davis and WNBA team Los Angeles Sparks's center, Lisa Leslie.

2001–2002
The 2001–2002 season featured several anomalies, as NBC started their coverage on the first Saturday of the season, for the first time since 1991. The reason for this was NBA legend Michael Jordan's return to playing, this time for the Washington Wizards. NBC covered an early December game featuring Jordan's Wizards as well, which marked the first time a broadcast television network aired more than one pre-Christmas NBA game since CBS in the 1980s.

That year also marked the return of Hannah Storm from maternity leave, with her and Ahmad Rashad alternating as studio hosts throughout the 2002 season. That year, NBC's studio team consisted of Rashad and Storm with former Philadelphia 76ers owner Pat Croce, the returning Mike Fratello, and former player Jayson Williams. The tandem stayed together through the 2002 NBA All-Star Game. During the week between the All-Star Game and NBC's next scheduled telecast, Williams was arrested after shooting and killing his limousine driver. He was promptly fired by NBC, which also did not return Croce or Fratello to studio coverage. Instead, the network brought in Tom Tolbert, who had only recently been added to NBC Sports as a third-string analyst paired with Mike Breen. Tolbert stayed on as the lone studio analyst through the end of the season, and won acclaim by several in the media, including USA Today sports columnist Rudy Martzke. Hannah Storm was not able to anchor the 2002 NBA All-Star Game as she was on assignment at the 2002 Winter Olympics in Salt Lake City serving as daytime studio host; Rashad solo anchored from the studio.

In June 2002, Rashad told the Los Angeles Times, in an interview conducted before the 2002 NBA Finals began, that he would be ending his 20-year run with NBC Sports, after hosting the pre-game show for Game 3 of the Finals. Hannah Storm, meanwhile, covered the 2002 NBA Finals as host of the CNBC post-game show.

Two days before NBC was to begin its playoff coverage, both Marv Albert and Mike Fratello, returning from working a Philadelphia 76ers–Indiana Pacers game on TNT, were seriously injured in a limousine accident. That week, NBC juggled its announcing teams, which resulted in Bob Costas and Paul Sunderland working some early-round playoff games, paired with Mike Dunleavy. Fratello would return to TNT after several days, and Albert returned to NBC for Game 1 of the Western Conference Semifinals between the Dallas Mavericks and Sacramento Kings.

The season would also turn out to be NBC's last with the NBA. In January 2002, the league announced a six-year agreement with The Walt Disney Company and AOL Time Warner, which resulted in the broadcast television rights being acquired by ABC. That year, NBC's playoff ratings were much higher than in previous years, including tallying record-high ratings for the 2002 Western Conference Finals. Those high ratings did not translate to the Finals, which scored their lowest ratings in over two decades.

List of broadcasters
 Marv Albert – lead play-by-play (1990–1997 and 2001–2002)
 Mike Breen – play-by-play
 Quinn Buckner – studio analyst (1990-1993)
 P. J. Carlesimo – studio analyst, game analyst (2000-2002)
 Doug Collins – game analyst (1998–2001)
 Bob Costas – studio host (1990–1997) and lead play-by-play (1998–2000)
 Don Criqui – play-by-play (1991-1992)
 Pat Croce – studio analyst (2001-2002)
 Chuck Daly – game analyst
 Mike Dunleavy - game analyst (2002)
 Dick Enberg – play-by-play
 Julius Erving – studio analyst
 Cotton Fitzsimmons – game analyst
 Mike Fratello – game analyst (1990–1993), studio analyst (2001–2002)
 Jim Gray – sideline reporter
 Greg Gumbel – play-by-play (1994–1998; left in January to return to CBS Sports)
 Matt Guokas – game analyst
 Tom Hammond – play-by-play (1990-2002)
 Dan Hicks – play-by-play
 Dan Issel – game analyst
 Kevin Johnson – studio analyst
 Lewis Johnson – sideline reporter
 Magic Johnson – game analyst (1991-1993)
 Steve "Snapper" Jones – game analyst (1990-2002)
 Andrea Joyce – sideline reporter
 Jim Lampley – play-by-play
 Lisa Malosky – sideline reporter
 Joel Meyers – sideline reporter
 Bob Neal – play-by-play
 Ahmad Rashad – sideline reporter, studio host (1990-2002)
 Pat Riley – studio analyst, game analyst (1990-1991)
 Ron Rothstein – game analyst (1991-1992)
 John Salley – studio analyst
 Hannah Storm – sideline reporter, studio host
 Paul Sunderland – play-by-play, sideline reporter
 Isiah Thomas – game analyst (1997–1998), studio analyst (1998–2000)
 Tom Tolbert – game analyst, studio analyst (2002)
 Peter Vecsey – studio analyst
 Bill Walton – studio analyst, game analyst (1994-2002)
 Jayson Williams – studio analyst (2001-2002)

Voice-over artists
Jim Fagan's voice was heard in nearly every single NBA telecast on NBC; as the voice behind "This is the NBA on NBC", he also did several voice-over promotions for the network's game broadcasts, along with "arena announcer" duties in EA Sports's NBA Live video game series. Mitch Phillips also did voice-over work for the broadcasts, primarily for promotions.

WNBA on NBC

NBC showed Women's National Basketball Association games from 1997 to 2002 as part of their NBA on NBC coverage before the league transferred the rights to ABC/ESPN.

NBA coverage on other NBC-owned outlets

Coverage on Telemundo Deportes
Following NBC's $2.7 billion purchase of Telemundo Communications Group from Sony Pictures and Liberty Media on October 11, 2001, Deportes Telemundo began to gradually be integrated into NBC Sports, although it would maintain sports programming rights separate from the main NBC broadcast network and its sister cable channels. Under NBC (which ironically lost the rights to the league that year to ABC), on August 20, 2002, Telemundo signed a three-year agreement with the NBA for the Spanish language broadcast rights to 15 NBA and up to ten WNBA regular season games; Telemundo and the NBA did not renew the deal upon its expiration following the 2004–05 season.

NBC Sports Regional Networks owned-and-operated outlets

Former networks

References

External links
 
 ESPN.com – NBA – PLAYOFFS 2002 – The day Tesh's music might die
 nba-low.mov QuickTime MOV video: voice-over Mitch Phillips on commercial spots for the NBA on NBC.
 NBA Showtime: NBA on NBC
NBA Showtime: NBA on NBC – Game Revolution Review Page
 NBA finalizes TV deals: Goodbye NBC
 Inquiry into Sports Programming Migration
 NBA on NBC – Short cut.
TV Theme – NBC, NBA 02.wav
 InsideHoops – NBA TV Contracts
 Jump The Shark – NBA on NBC

Basketball on NBC
Black-and-white American television shows
CNBC original programming
NBC
NBC original programming
1954 American television series debuts
1962 American television series endings
1990 American television series debuts
2002 American television series endings